TAUCETI Unknown Origin is an upcoming video game developed and published by BadFly Interactive. The game is set in the same universe as Dead Effect and Dead Effect 2.

Development
The game was announced on 7 August 2017 when BadFly Interactive released the first teaser.

Plot
The story is set after Dead Effect 2. The fictional spaceship ESS Meridian floats in the universe without direction after a system overload. The player has to escape using an escape pod, and crashes on Tau Ceti f. The player wakes up in a dense jungle and has to survive the harsh environment of the planet.

References

External links 
 

Upcoming video games
First-person shooters
Science fiction video games
Video games developed in the Czech Republic
Unreal Engine games
Windows games
MacOS games
Single-player video games
Xbox One games
PlayStation 4 games